The Coolpix L15 is a compact point-and-shoot digital camera produced by Nikon. It is branded as part of the "Life" or "L-series" cameras in the Coolpix family. It has an 8.0 megapixel maximum resolution, 2.8" TFT LCD monitor, 3x Optical Zoom, D-Lighting, Vibration Reduction and Face-priority AF. It is no longer in production.

References

External links
 Imaging - Coolpix L15
 Nikon Coolpix L15: Digital Photography Review

L015